Agrabad is a downtown commercial and financial area in Chattogram, the second largest city of Bangladesh. Located close to the city's harbor, it hosts numerous Bangladeshi and international businesses, banks, financial institutions, and other commercial entities. The Chattogram Chamber of Commerce & Industry, the World Trade Center, and the Chattogram Stock Exchange are most prominent of them. The area forms part of the Double Mooring precinct and is directly connected to the Port of Chattogram.

Badam-tali, Agrabad Access Road, Sk Mujib Road, Sabdar Ali Road etc. are some of the important commercial streets located in central Agrabad. The city's other commercial hubs Strand Road, and Sadarghat are also situated nearby.

History

The area was originally a village which was incorporated into the city in 1947. After the end of colonial rule, the modern financial district developed during the 1950s.

Commercial activities

Many of Bangladesh's largest companies, as well as various multinational firms, have their headquarters or branches located in Agrabad. There are many private commercial banks including AB Bank Limited, Bangladesh Commerce Bank Limited, BRAC Bank Limited, The City Bank Limited, Dhaka Bank Limited, Dutch Bangla Bank Limited, Eastern Bank Limited, IFIC Bank Limited, Mercantile Bank Limited, Mutual Trust Bank Ltd., National Bank Limited, NCC Bank Limited, One Bank Limited, The Premier Bank Limited, Prime Bank Limited, Southeast Bank Limited, Standard Bank Limited, Trust Bank Limited, United Commercial Bank Ltd., Uttara Bank Limited etc.
Some Islamic commercial banks also located at Agrabad they are Islami Bank of Bangladesh Limited, Export Import Bank of Bangladesh Limited, Shahjalal Islami Bank Limited, Al-Arafah Islami Bank Limited.
Major foreign commercial banks located in Agrabad include Citibank NA, HSBC, Standard Chartered Bank, Commercial Bank of Ceylon, State Bank of India and National Bank of Pakistan.
There are many Specialized development banks are Bangladesh Krishi Bank, BASIC Bank Limited,
There are also located kinds of Non-bank financial institution, Insurance company, Telecommunication company and others multinational companies are located. Chittagong Chamber of Commerce & Industry, The World Trade Center Chittagong (WTC Chittagong) etc. commercial building located in the Agrabad Commercial Area.

Institutions and structures
Government buildings

 BSTI Building
 Bidyut Bhaban
 BTCL Building
 BSCIC Building
 Chittagong Government Office Buildings (CGO)

 Other high-rises
 Aziz Court Imperial
 Banani Complex
 C&F Tower
 Makkah Madina Trade Centre 
 World Trade Center Chittagong
Madina Tower 71

 Government Colonies
 Agrabad CGS (Masjid) Colony, aka Chittagong Government Service Colony
 Agrabad Multi Storied Colony
 Agrabad Government C&B Colony
 Bangladesh Bank Colony
 Bahutola Colony
 Gazetted Officers' Colony
 Health Colony
 Postal Officers' Colony
 P. T. & T. Colony
 WASA Staff Colony

 Shopping Complex
 Akhtaruzzaman Center
 EBL (Eastern Bank Ltd) Street Market
 Lucky Plaza
 New Dubai IT Bhaban
 Southland Center
 Singapore Bangkok Market

 Community Centre
 Agrabad Community Center
 Agrabad Convention Hall
 Guljer Convention Center

Hotel & Restaurant
 Hotel Agrabad
 Orchid Business Hotel
 Landmark Hotel
 Shangri-La Chinese Restaurant
 Silver Spoon
Best Western Alliance Hotel

Tourism

Ethnological Museum

The Ethnological Museum established in 1965, is the only ethnological museum in the country. It offers the visitors the chance to acquaint with the lifestyles and heritage of various ethnic groups of the country. The museum authority had collected rare elements used in the everyday lives of different ethnic groups, of which some had already become extinct while some were on the verge of extinction. It contains four galleries and a small hall. Three galleries of the museum feature diverse elements of twenty nine ethnic groups in Bangladesh, while the rest of the gallery displays the lifestyles of some ethnic groups of India, Pakistan and Australia.

The sculptures of the people of different ethnic communities and a piece of broken Berlin Wall attracts visitors, which close to display since 2017. People can get the impression of different festivals, livelihoods, and cultures of the communities from the murals set up at the hall room. These are reminiscent of the museum in the film Planet of the Apes. Around 200–300 people visit the museum every day.

Jamboree Park

Jamboree Park is the most visited stunning urban park located at SM Morshed Road at central Agrabad. The park offers a dazzling view at night with several hundred lamps on its pool-like body of water and walkways.

Agrabad Deba

Agrabad Deba pool (small body of water in Bengali) is about 14 acres human-made water reservoir is being this place in the Agrabad commercial area beside Sheikh Mujib Road since the last century. The pool is a place for flyfishing, where it arranging fishing competition every year. It was dug for the Bangladesh Railway and employees of the Port of Chittagong as well as the Chittagong city dwellers during the British period to carry out their daily chores and other activities. After the water reservoir owned by the Bangladesh Railway.

Karnaphuli Shishu Park
Karnaphuli Shishu Park is a recreation park for children located in Jamburi Field near the Bangladesh Bank Colony.

Education
Private medical colleges
 Chattagram Maa-O-Shishu Hospital Medical College

Colleges

 Agrabad Mohila College
 Government Commerce College

Schools

 Agrabad Balika Bidyalay
 Agrabad Government Colony High School
 Bangladesh Bank Colony High School
 Hatey Khari School & College
 Khawja Ajmeri High School
 Silver Bells Kindergarten & Girls' High School
 T & T High School

Health
 Chattagram Maa-O-Shishu Hospital

Media
 Bangladesh Betar, Chittagong

Transportation

Transport in Agrabad is similar to that of the city, Chittagong. Several roads are present throughout the area. There are various bus transport systems and taxi services, as well as smaller 'baby' or 'CNG' taxis, which are basically tricycle-structured motor vehicles. There are also traditional manual rickshaws, which are very common.

The Agrabad Access road and Sheikh Mujib road are a major arterial road, is the main way to access the area by motor vehicle and otherwise. Those are considered a very busy and populated road, and though are currently 2-lane road.

Agrabad Access Road
Agrabad Access Road is a main commercial road located at Agrabad. It is extended to the south side, between Double Mooring Thana and Halishahar Thana. The road started from Badamtali, and crossed Bepari Para, Shantibag, and Boropool.

Sabdar Ali Road
Sabdar Ali Road is a main commercial road located at Agrabad commercial area in central Agradad. It is extended to the eastern side, beside Agrabad Access Road. The road started from Badamtali and connected with Commerce College Road with surrounded to the total commercial area.

Strand Road

Sister areas

Gallery

See also
 Chittagong
 Chittagong district
 Chittagong Division
 Chittagong City Corporation

References

External links

 
Neighborhoods in Chittagong
Financial districts in Bangladesh